The Falaise pocket or battle of the Falaise pocket (12–21 August 1944) was the decisive engagement of the Battle of Normandy in the Second World War. Allied forces formed a pocket around Falaise, Calvados, in which German Army Group B, with the 7th Army and the Fifth Panzer Army (formerly ) were encircled by the Western Allies. The battle resulted in the destruction of most of Army Group B west of the Seine, which opened the way to Paris and the Franco-German border.

Overview
Six weeks after the 6 June 1944 Allied invasion of Normandy, German forces were in turmoil. The Allies had experienced strong resistance. British forces had expected to liberate Caen immediately after the invasion but this took nearly two months. Similarly, US forces had expected to control Saint-Lô by the 7 June. However, German resistance delayed this until after Caen's liberation. 

However, the German Army expended irreplaceable resources defending the frontline. Allied air forces achieved air superiority up to 100 km behind enemy lines. Allied forces continuously bombed and strafed German logistical lines, limiting the availability of fuel and ammunition. The German Army had used its available reserves (especially its armour reserves) to buttress the front lines around Caen, leaving few additional troops to create successive lines of defence.

The Allied armies developed a multi-stage operation. It started with a British/Canadian attack along the eastern line around Caen in Operation Goodwood on 18 July. The German Army responded by sending a large portion of its armoured reserves to defend. On 25 July thousands of American bombers carpet bombed a 6,000-metre corridor on the western end of the German lines around Saint-Lô in Operation Cobra. American forces pushed into the resulting gap. The German forces were overwhelmed and the Americans broke through. 

On 1 August, Lieutenant General George S. Patton was named the commanding officer of the newly recommissioned US Third Army—which included large segments of the force that had broken through the German lines. The Third Army quickly pushed south and then east, meeting little resistance. Concurrently, the British/Canadian troops pushed south (Operation Bluecoat) in an attempt to keep the German armour engaged. They forced the Germans back; the orderly withdrawal eventually collapsed due to lack of fuel.

Hitler did not allow Army Group B commander Field Marshal Günther von Kluge to withdraw, instead ordering him to conduct Operation Lüttich, a counter-offensive at Mortain against the US. Four depleted panzer divisions were insufficient to defeat the First US Army, driving the Germans deeper into the Allied envelopment.

On 8 August, Allied ground forces commander General Bernard Montgomery ordered the Allied armies to converge on the Falaise–Chambois area to envelop Army Group B, with the First US Army forming the southern arm, the British the base, and the Canadians the northern arm of the encirclement. The Germans began to withdraw on 17 August, and on 19 August the Allies linked up in Chambois. Gaps were forced in the Allied lines by German counter-attacks. The biggest was a corridor forced past the 1st Polish Armoured Division on Hill 262, a commanding position at the pocket mouth. By the evening of 21 August, the pocket had been sealed, with  trapped inside. Many Germans escaped, but losses were huge. The Allied Liberation of Paris came a few days later, and on 30 August the remnants of Army Group B retreated across the Seine, completing Operation Overlord.

Background

Operation Overlord

Early Allied objectives in the wake of the D-Day invasion of German-occupied France included the deep water port of Cherbourg and the area surrounding the town of Caen. Allied attacks to expand the bridgehead had rapidly defeated the initial German attempts to destroy the invasion force, but bad weather in the English Channel delayed the Allied build-up of supplies and reinforcements, while enabling the Germans to move troops and supplies with less interference from the Allied air forces. Cherbourg was not captured by the VII US Corps until 27 June, and the German defence of Caen lasted until 20 July, when the southern districts were taken by the British/Canadians in Operation Goodwood and Operation Atlantic.

General Bernard Montgomery, the Allied ground forces commander, had planned a strategy of attracting German forces to the east end of the bridgehead against the British/Canadians, while the US First Army advanced down the west side of the Cotentin Peninsula to Avranches. On 25 July the US First Army commander, Lieutenant-General Omar Bradley, began Operation Cobra. Avranches was captured on 30 July and within 24 hours the US VIII Corps of the US Third Army crossed the bridge at Pontaubault into Brittany and continued south and west through open country, almost without opposition.

Operation Lüttich

The US advance was swift and by 8 August, Le Mans, the former headquarters of the German 7th Army, had been captured. After Operation Cobra, Operation Bluecoat and Operation Spring, the German army in Normandy was so reduced that "only a few SS fanatics still entertained hopes of avoiding defeat". On the Eastern Front, Operation Bagration had begun against Army Group Centre which left no possibility of reinforcement of the Western Front. Adolf Hitler sent a directive to Field Marshal Günther von Kluge, the replacement commander of Army Group B after the sacking of Gerd von Rundstedt, ordering "an immediate counter-attack between Mortain and Avranches" to "annihilate" the enemy and make contact with the west coast of the Cotentin peninsula.

Eight of the nine Panzer divisions in Normandy were to be used in the attack, but only four could be made ready in time. The German commanders protested that their forces were incapable of an offensive, but the warnings were ignored and Operation Lüttich commenced on 7 August around Mortain. The first attacks were made by the 2nd Panzer Division, SS Division Leibstandarte and the SS Division Das Reich, but they had only 75 Panzer IVs, 70 Panthers and 32 self-propelled guns. The Allies were forewarned by Ultra signals intercepts, and although the offensive continued until 13 August, the threat of Operation Lüttich had been ended within 24 hours. Operation Lüttich had led to the most powerful remaining German units being defeated at the west side of the Cotentin Peninsula by the US First Army, and the Normandy front on the verge of collapse. Bradley said,

Operation Totalize

The First Canadian Army was ordered to capture high ground north of Falaise to trap Army Group B. The Canadians planned Operation Totalize, with attacks by strategic bombers and a novel night attack using Kangaroo armoured personnel carriers. Verrières Ridge and Cintheaux were captured on 9 August, but the speed of the advance was slowed by German resistance and some poor Canadian unit leadership, which led to many casualties in the 4th Canadian (Armoured) Division and 1st Polish Armoured Division. By 10 August, Anglo-Canadian forces had reached Hill 195, north of Falaise. The following day, Canadian commander Guy Simonds relieved the armoured divisions with infantry divisions, ending the offensive.

Allied plan 
Still expecting Kluge to withdraw his forces from the tightening Allied noose, Montgomery had for some time been planning a "long envelopment", by which the British/Canadians would pivot left from Falaise toward the River Seine while the US Third Army blocked the escape route between the Seine and the Loire, trapping all surviving German forces in western France. In a telephone conversation on 8 August, the Supreme Allied Commander, General Dwight D. Eisenhower, recommended an American proposal for a shorter envelopment at Argentan. Montgomery and Patton had misgivings; if the Allies did not take Argentan, Alençon and Falaise quickly, many Germans might escape. Believing he could always fall back on the original plan if necessary, Montgomery accepted the wishes of Bradley as the man on the spot, and the proposal was adopted.

Battle
It is also referred to as the battle of the Falaise gap (after the corridor which the Germans sought to maintain to allow their escape).

Operation Tractable

The Third Army advance from the south made good progress on 12 August; Alençon was captured and Kluge was forced to commit troops he had been gathering for a counter-attack. The next day, the US 5th Armored Division of the US XV Corps advanced  and reached positions overlooking Argentan. On 13 August, Bradley over-ruled orders by Patton for a further push northwards towards Falaise by the 5th Armored Division. Bradley instead ordered the XV Corps to "concentrate for operations in another direction". The US troops near Argentan were ordered to withdraw, which ended the pincer movement by the XV Corps. Patton objected but complied, which left an exit for the German forces in the Falaise pocket.

With the Americans on the southern flank halted and then engaged with Panzer Group Eberbach, and with the British pressing in from the north-west, the First Canadian Army, which included the Polish 1st Armoured Division, was ordered to close the trap. After a limited attack by the 2nd Canadian Infantry Division down the Laize valley on 12–13 August, most of the time since Totalize had been spent preparing for Operation Tractable, a set-piece attack on Falaise. The operation commenced on 14 August at 11:42, covered by an artillery smokescreen that mimicked the night attack of Operation Totalize.

Navigating through the smoke slowed progress, and the mistaken use by the First Canadian Army of yellow smoke to identify their positions—the same colour strategic bombers used to mark targets—led to some bombing of the Canadians and slower progress than planned. On 15 August, the 2nd and 3rd Canadian Infantry Divisions and the 2nd Canadian (Armoured) Brigade continued the offensive, but progress remained slow. The 4th Armoured Division captured Soulangy against determined German resistance and several German counter-attacks, which prevented a breakthrough to Trun. The next day, the 2nd Canadian Infantry Division entered Falaise against minor opposition from Waffen SS units and scattered pockets of German infantry, and by 17 August had secured the town.

At midday on 16 August, Kluge had refused an order from Hitler for another counter-attack, and in the afternoon Hitler agreed to a withdrawal but became suspicious that Kluge intended to surrender to the Allies. Late on 17 August, Hitler sacked Kluge and recalled him to Germany; Kluge then either killed himself or was executed by SS-officer Jürgen Stroop for his involvement in the 20 July plot. Kluge was succeeded by Field Marshal Walter Model, whose first act was to order the immediate retreat of the 7th Army and Fifth Panzer Army, while the II SS Panzer Corps—with the remnants of four Panzer divisions—held the north face of the escape route against the British/Canadians, and the XLVII Panzer Corps—with what was left of two Panzer divisions—held the southern face against the Third US Army.

Throughout the retreat, German columns were constantly harried by Allied fighter bombers of the US Ninth Air Force and the RAF Second Tactical Air Force, using bombs, rockets and guns, turning the escape routes into killing grounds. Despite claims of large numbers of tanks and other vehicles destroyed from the air, a post-battle investigation showed that only eleven armoured vehicles could be proved to have had been destroyed by aircraft, although about one third of wrecked trucks were lost to air attack and many others had been destroyed or abandoned by their crews, probably due to the air threat.

Encirclement

On 17 August the encirclement was still incomplete. The 1st Polish Armoured Division, part of the First Canadian Army, was divided into three battlegroups and ordered to make a wide sweep to the south-east to meet American troops at Chambois. Trun fell to the 4th Canadian Armoured Division on 18 August. Having captured Champeaux on 19 August, the Polish battlegroups converged on Chambois, and with reinforcements from the 4th Canadian Armoured Division, the Poles secured the town and linked up with the US 90th and French 2nd Armoured divisions by evening. The Allies were not yet astride the 7th Army escape route in any great strength, and their positions were attacked by German troops inside the pocket. An armoured column of the 2nd Panzer Division broke through the Canadians in St. Lambert, took half the village and kept a road open for six hours until nightfall. Many Germans escaped, and small parties made their way through to the Dives during the night.

Having taken Chambois, two of the Polish battlegroups drove north-east and established themselves on part of Hill 262 (Mont Ormel ridge), spending the night of 19 August digging in. The following morning, Model ordered elements of the 2nd SS Panzer Division and 9th SS Panzer Division to attack from outside the pocket towards the Polish positions. Around midday, several units of the 10th SS Panzer Division, 12th SS Panzer Division and 116th Panzer Division managed to break through the Polish lines and open a corridor, while the 9th SS Panzer Division prevented the Canadians from intervening. By mid-afternoon, about 10,000 German troops had passed out of the pocket.

The Poles held on to Hill 262 (The Mace), and were able from their vantage point to direct artillery fire on to the retreating Germans. Paul Hausser, the 7th Army commander, ordered that the Polish positions be "eliminated". The remnants of the 352nd Infantry Division and several battle groups from the 2nd SS Panzer Division inflicted many casualties on the 8th and 9th battalions of the Polish Division, but the assault was eventually repulsed at the cost of nearly all of their ammunition, and the Poles watched as the remnants of the XLVII Panzer Corps escaped. During the night there was sporadic fighting, and the Poles called for frequent artillery bombardments to disrupt the German retreat from the sector.

German attacks resumed the next morning, but the Poles retained their foothold on the ridge. At about 11:00, a final attempt on the positions of the 9th Battalion was launched by nearby SS troops, which was defeated at close quarters. Soon after midday, the Canadian Grenadier Guards reached Mont Ormel, and by late afternoon the remainder of the 2nd and 9th SS Panzer Divisions had begun their retreat to the Seine. For the Falaise pocket operation, the 1st Polish Armoured Division listed 1,441 casualties including 466 killed, while Polish casualties at Mont Ormel were 351 killed and wounded, with eleven tanks lost. German losses in their assaults on the ridge were estimated at 500 killed and 1,000 men taken prisoner, most from the 12th SS-Panzer Division. Scores of Tiger, Panther and Panzer IV tanks were destroyed, along with many artillery pieces.

By the evening of 21 August, tanks of the 4th Canadian Armoured Division had linked with Polish forces at Coudehard, and the 2nd and 3rd Canadian Infantry divisions had secured St. Lambert and the northern passage to Chambois; the Falaise pocket had been sealed. Approximately 20–50,000 German troops, minus heavy equipment, escaped through the gap and were reorganized and rearmed, in time to slow the Allied advance into Eastern France, the Netherlands, Belgium and Germany.

Aftermath

Analysis

The battle of the Falaise pocket ended the Battle of Normandy with a decisive German defeat. Hitler's involvement had been damaging from the first day, with his insistence on hopelessly unrealistic counter-offensives, micro-management of generals, and refusal to countenance withdrawal when his armies were threatened with annihilation. More than forty German divisions were destroyed during the Battle of Normandy. No exact figures are available, but historians estimate that the battle cost the German forces an estimated 450,000 men, of whom  killed or wounded. The Allied air forces lost  killed or missing in connection with Operation Overlord. The final battle of Operation Overlord, the Liberation of Paris, followed on 25 August, and Overlord ended by 30 August, with the retreat of the last German unit across the Seine.

The area in which the pocket had formed was full of the remains of battle. Villages had been destroyed, and derelict equipment made some roads impassable. Corpses of soldiers and civilians littered the area, along with thousands of dead cattle and horses. In the hot August weather, maggots crawled over the bodies, and swarms of flies descended on the area. Pilots reported being able to smell the stench of the battlefield hundreds of feet above it. General Eisenhower recorded that:

Fear of infection from the rancid conditions led the Allies to declare the area an "unhealthy zone". Clearing the area was a low priority though, and went on until well into November. Many swollen bodies had to be shot to expunge gases within them before they could be burnt, and bulldozers were used to clear the area of dead animals.

Disappointed that a significant portion of the German army had escaped from the pocket, many Allied commanders, particularly among the Americans, were critical of what they perceived as Montgomery's lack of urgency in closing the pocket. Writing shortly after the war, Ralph Ingersoll—a prominent peacetime journalist, who had served as a planner on Eisenhower's staff—expressed the prevailing American view at the time:

Some historians have thought that the gap could have been closed earlier; Wilmot wrote that despite having British divisions in reserve, Montgomery did not reinforce Guy Simonds and that the Canadian drive on Trun and Chambois was not "vigorous and venturesome" as the situation demanded. The British author and historian Max Hastings wrote that Montgomery, having witnessed what he called a poor Canadian performance during Totalize, should have brought up veteran British divisions to take the lead. D'Este and Blumenson wrote that Montgomery and Harry Crerar might have done more to impart momentum to the British/Canadians. Patton's post-battle claim that the Americans could have prevented the German escape, had Bradley not ordered him to stop at Argentan, was "absurd over-simplification".

Wilmot wrote that "contrary to contemporary reports, the Americans did not capture Argentan until 20 August, the day after the link up at Chambois". The American unit that closed the gap between Argentan and Chambois, the 90th Division, was according to Hastings one of the least effective of any Allied army in Normandy. He speculated that the real reason Bradley halted Patton was not fear of accidental clashes with the British, but knowledge that, with powerful German formations still operational, the Americans lacked the means to defend an early blocking position and would have suffered an "embarrassing and gratuitous setback" at the hands of the retreating Fallschirmjäger and the 2nd and 12th SS-Panzer divisions. Bradley wrote after the war that:

Casualties
By 22 August, all German forces west of the Allied lines were dead or in captivity. Historians differ in their estimates of German losses in the pocket. Williams wrote that  troops escaped. Tamelander estimated that  troops were caught, of whom  killed and  prisoner, while perhaps another . In the northern sector, German losses included , self-propelled guns and other light armoured vehicles, as well  soft-skinned vehicles and  abandoned or destroyed. By 22 August 1944, the 12th SS-Panzer Division "Hitlerjugend" had lost c. 8,000 men, out of its initial strength of 20,540, alongside most of its tanks and vehicles, which had been redistributed among several Kampfgruppe in the previous weeks. Although elements of several German formations had managed to escape to the east, even these had left behind most of their equipment.

See also
 Allied advance from Paris to the Rhine
 Battle of the Mons Pocket
 Colmar Pocket
 Liberation of France

Notes

Footnotes

Citations

References

Further reading

External links

 
 
 
 
 
 
 
 
 

Operation Overlord
Battles of World War II involving the United Kingdom
Battles of World War II involving the United States
Battles of World War II involving Canada
Military operations of World War II involving Germany
Battles of World War II involving France
Battles and operations of World War II involving Poland
Western European Campaign (1944–1945)
Encirclements in World War II
Tank battles
Tank battles of World War II
August 1944 events
1944 in France
Calvados (department)